Bar-le-duc jelly is a highly regarded preparation of jelly originally composed of select whole seeded currants, typically white currants or red currants. The name Bar-le-duc refers to the geographical origin of the preparation in the French town of Bar-le-duc. Since the jelly's first documented reference in 1344, the culinary name "Lorraine jelly" is occasionally used, as the city of Bar-le-duc lies within the boundaries of the former province of Lorraine.

Commonly served as an accompaniment to game, spread on bread, or with foie gras, it is considered a culinary luxury, purportedly sharing an elite status akin to Beluga caviar and is colloquially referred to as Bar caviar. The typical product is a jam, with the berries remaining intact in a thin syrup. About 200 currants go into one 85 gram jar (approximately 3 ounces), which costs approximately €18 a jar in Bar-le-Duc (as of 2021) and $40 in the US. The spread has been enjoyed by notables such as Alfred Hitchcock, Ernest Hemingway, Victor Hugo, and Mary, Queen of Scots.

Examples 
,  the House of Dutriez in the town of Bar-le-Duc provides one of the very few hand-made preparations still on the market, la confiture de Groseilles de Bar le Duc (Currant Preserve).  The traditionally hand-made product involves  épépineurs or épépineuses (seed extractors) de-seeding the currants with goose quills to flick out the tiny seeds without disturbing the flesh of the small fruit.  Sometimes sweetened jellies, consisting of mashed and sieved currants of a significantly lower cost and quality, appear on the market under the same name.

See also
 List of spreads

Notes

References
 Barry, Ann.  Bar-Le-Duc Currant Preserves.  The New York Times : Arts and Leisure Section.  January 30, 1983.
 Anon. Royal Jelly. Waitrose.  February 2000
 Anon. Homepage of Bar-le-Duc France, Delights and Traditions, in English Ville de Bar-le-duc, France.  August 2009.

External links
 House of Dutriez Confitures à la Lorraine (House of Dutriez).
 Homepage of the City of Bar-le-duc, France, in French.

Spreads (food)